Adrián Ortolá Vañó (born 20 August 1993) is a Spanish professional footballer who plays as a goalkeeper for CE Sabadell FC.

Club career

Villarreal
Born in Xàbia, Alicante, Valencian Community, Ortolá joined local Villarreal CF's youth system in 2008. He made his senior debut with the B team in Segunda División B, his first game in the competition being a 3–0 away loss against CF Reus Deportiu on 2 September 2012.

Barcelona
On 10 July 2013, Ortolá moved to FC Barcelona, signing for three years as a free agent and being assigned to the reserves in Segunda División. He played his first match as a professional on 30 November, in a 2–1 win at Córdoba CF.

Ortolá made 26 appearances in his second season, which ended with relegation to the third division. On 21 March 2015, he was given a straight red card in the 25th minute of an eventual 2–1 away defeat to AD Alcorcón for conceding a penalty kick with a foul on David Rodríguez.

On 11 July 2016, Ortolá was loaned to La Liga club Deportivo Alavés for one year, with the option for another. He made his debut in the competition on 8 January 2017, starting at Athletic Bilbao as habitual starter Fernando Pacheco was not fully fit and contributing to the 0–0 away draw.

On 24 July 2018, Ortolá joined Deportivo de La Coruña on a season-long loan deal with the option to buy.

Tenerife
On 12 July 2019, Ortolá signed a two-year contract with CD Tenerife. He immediately became a starter for the club ahead of longtime incumbent Dani Hernández, but lost his starting spot to the same player after the arrival of new manager Luis Miguel Ramis in November 2020.

Girona
Ortolá joined fellow second-division side Girona FC on 1 February 2021, on a two-and-a-half-year deal. A backup to Juan Carlos, he featured in four league matches during the 2021–22 campaign, as the club achieved promotion to the top tier.

On 4 August 2022, Ortolá terminated his contract with the Catalans.

Deinze
Ortolá moved abroad for the first time in his career on 5 August 2022, signing a one-year deal with K.M.S.K. Deinze in Belgium. He had his contract mutually terminated on 30 January 2023.

CE Sabadell
On 30 January 2023, Ortolá returned to Spain and joined CE Sabadell FC.

Club statistics

Honours
Spain U17 
UEFA European Under-17 Championship runner-up: 2010

Spain U19
UEFA European Under-19 Championship: 2011, 2012

References

External links
FC Barcelona official profile

1993 births
Living people
People from Xàbia
Sportspeople from the Province of Alicante
Spanish footballers
Footballers from the Valencian Community
Association football goalkeepers
La Liga players
Segunda División players
Segunda División B players
Tercera División players
Villarreal CF C players
Villarreal CF B players
FC Barcelona Atlètic players
Deportivo Alavés players
Deportivo de La Coruña players
CD Tenerife players
Girona FC players
K.M.S.K. Deinze players
CE Sabadell FC footballers
Spanish expatriate footballers
Spanish expatriate sportspeople in Belgium
Expatriate footballers in Belgium
Spain youth international footballers